Michael Farris may refer to:
 Michael Farris (lawyer), American constitutional lawyer
 Mike Farris (musician), American musician